Pretty Bird is a 2008 American comedy film. It competed in the Dramatic Competition at the 2008 Sundance Film Festival and was released on DVD in the United States on June 29, 2010.

Plot
A sweet-natured guy enlists his best friend, and an engineer who lost his job and has an attitude problem, to help him create and market his idea for a rocket-powered belt. The entrepreneur never loses his confidence the idea will work even though he runs into problems that include finding investors and disagreements with his engineer.

Cast
Billy Crudup as Curtis Prentiss
Paul Giamatti as Rick Honeycutt
David Hornsby as Kenny Owenby
Kristen Wiig as Mandy Riddle
Elizabeth Marvel as Tonya Honeycutt
Denis O'Hare as Chuck Stutters
Garret Dillahunt as Carson Thrash
James Wetzel as Dennis
Anna Camp as Becca French
Nate Mooney as Randy Pendler
Aasif Mandvi as Ted the Banker
Adam LeFevre as Phil the Neighbor
Lennon Parham as Woman with Beef

Reception
Rotten Tomatoes gives the film a score of 20% based on reviews from 5 critics.

Robert Koehler of Variety criticized the film as being "overly calculated" and predictable, noting that the only bright spot in the film was its soundtrack. Duane Byrge of The Hollywood Reporter wrote ""Pretty Bird flaps one comic wing and one dramatic wing, but this slight-framed bird never soars and ultimately crashes under the weight of its excessive thematic ballast".

References

Bibliography

External links

American aviation films
American films based on actual events
American independent films
Films scored by Wim Mertens
Films shot in New Jersey
2008 directorial debut films
2008 independent films
2000s English-language films
2000s American films